Brodie Smith may refer to:

Brodie Smith (footballer) (born 1992), Australian rules footballer
Brodie Smith (goalball player) (born 1998), Australian athlete
Brodie Smith (ultimate) (born 1987), American athlete